Glenea dorsalis is a species of beetle in the family Cerambycidae. It was described by Bernhard Schwarzer in 1930.

References

dorsalis
Beetles described in 1930